Metropolitan Paul (secular name Georgiy Vasilevich Ponomaryov, ; born 19 February 1951 in Karaganda) was the Metropolitan of Minsk and Slutsk, the Patriarchal Exarch of All Belarus and the leader of the Belarusian Orthodox Church (an Semi-Autonomous part of the Russian Orthodox Church) from December 2011 to August 2020. On August 26, 2020 by decision of the Holy Synod of Bishops of the Russian Orthodox Church and at the request of Metropolitan Paul, Metropolitan Paul was released from his duties as Metropolitan of Minsk and Slutsk and Patriarchal Exarch of Belarus. Metropolitan Paul was assigned to the Krasnodar and Kuban Diocese of the Russian Orthodox Church effective August 26, 2020.

Biography 
Metropolitan Paul was born on 19 February 1952 in Karaganda.

In 1973–1976, he attended the Moscow Theological Seminary. In 1980 he graduated from the Moscow Theological Academy with a degree in theology.

On 19 February 1992 by the decision of the Holy Synod of the Russian Orthodox Church he was appointed Bishop of Zaraisk and was put in charge of the patriarchal parishes in the United States and in Canada.

29 December 1999 he was appointed Bishop of Vienna and Austria.

23 February 2001 he was elevated to the rank of Archbishop.

7 May 2003 he was appointed Archbishop of Ryazan and Kasimov.

He became Exarch in December 2013 after the former Exarch, Philaret (Vakhromeyev), stepped down.
Metropolitan Paul was assigned to the Krasnodar and Kuban Diocese of the Russian Orthodox Church effective August 26, 2020.

References

Living people
1951 births
Clergy from Minsk
Bishops of the Belarusian Orthodox Church
Eastern Orthodox Christians from Belarus
People from Karaganda
Russian Orthodoxy in the United States
Eastern Orthodoxy in Austria
Eastern Orthodoxy in Hungary